Spinner's weasel or clock reel is a mechanical yarn-measuring device consisting of a spoked wheel with gears attached to a pointer on a marked face (which looks like a clock) and an internal mechanism which makes a "pop" sound after the desired length of yarn is measured (usually a skein).  The pointer allows the spinner to see how close she/he is to reaching a skein.  The weasel's gear ratio is usually 40 to 1, and the circumference of the reel is usually two yards, thus producing an 80-yard skein when the weasel pops (after 40 revolutions).  

Some reels or skein winders are made without the gear mechanism (see swift (textiles)). They perform the same function, but without the "clock" or pop to aid the spinner in keeping track of the length of thread or yarn produced.  A niddy noddy is an even simpler version. The wrap reel, on the other hand, is even more complex, with a mechanism for standardizing the tension.

The clock reel is a possible source for the word "weasel" in the nursery rhyme Pop Goes the Weasel.

References

External links

Hand spinning tools